Joseph P. Allen is an American psychologist and academic. He is currently (as of October 2022) the Hugh P. Kelly Professor of Psychology at the University of Virginia.

Education
He received a B.A. in psychology from the University of Virginia in May 1980, and then a Ph.D. in Clinical/Community Psychology from Yale University in May 1986. He subsequently worked as a post-doctoral fellow in research at Harvard Medical School from 1986 until 1988.

Research
His research focuses  on the predictors and long-term outcomes of social development processes from adolescence into adulthood and he is currently 25 years into a 30-year study on these topics.   He also develops and examines socially-focused interventions for adolescents designed to improve long-term academic and mental health outcomes.

Together with Claudia W. Allen, he is author of Escaping the Endless Adolescence: How We Can Help Our Teenagers Grow Up Before They Grow Old.. In 2016, he founded The Connection Project, a small group intervention for high school and college students that has been documented to reduce loneliness and depressive symptoms and enhance a sense of belonging.  The program is now being implemented at the high school level by Wyman of St. Louis, and at the college level at the University of Virginia.

References

External links

www.teenresearch.org

1958 births
Living people
University of Virginia faculty
21st-century American psychologists
Yale Graduate School of Arts and Sciences alumni
20th-century American psychologists